Świerczewski (feminine: Świerczewska; plural: Świerczewscy) is a Polish surname. It may refer to:
 Karol Świerczewski (1897–1947), Polish and Soviet general
 Marek Świerczewski (born 1967), Polish footballer
 Piotr Świerczewski (born 1972), Polish footballer

See also
 

Polish-language surnames